Kola Adesina (born 1964) is a Nigerian entrepreneur, managing director of Sahara Group, former Chairman of Egbin Power Plc, and board chairman of Ikeja Electric.

Education 
Adesina earned a B.sc degree in Insurance and M.Sc degree in Business from the University of Lagos. He furthered his education by obtaining executive programmes in Harvard Business School and The Wharton School Advanced Management Program.

Career 
Before Sahara Group, Adesina started his career working in the Insurance industry later joined Sahara Group where he moved up the ladder due to his selling skills. At Sahara Group, he led various projects which include the nation-wide strategic management of the supply chain of Fuel to the Emergency Power Plant of the defunct National Electricity Power Authority (now Power Holding Company Nigeria Limited), the Majestic Oil delegation on the acquisition of the Sierra Leone Refinery and also managed the Crude Oil contract of the Group in Côte d'Ivoire where he also served as the Director of Infrastructure, responsible for the acquisition of strategic assets in Africa.

He served as a member of the Presidential Committee inaugurated by President Jonathan on the Accelerated Expansion of the Electricity Infrastructure in Nigeria, which culminated in the unbundling of PHCN successor companies. He also chairs the board of Ikeja Electric.

In 2022, he was crowned as Vanguard Private Sector Icon of the Year.

References 

Living people
1964 births
21st-century Nigerian businesspeople
Nigerian company founders
Harvard Business School alumni